Tero is a Finnish masculine given name that may refer to
Tero Föhr (born 1980), Finnish orienteer
Tero Järvenpää (born 1984), Finnish javelin thrower
Tero Kalliolevo (born 1977), Finnish sport quizzer
Tero Koskela (born 1976), Finnish footballer
Tero Mäntylä (born 1991), Finnish footballer
Tero Penttilä (born 1975), Finnish footballer
Tero Pitkämäki (born 1982), Finnish javelin thrower
Tero Puha (born 1971), Finnish visual artist, photographer and filmmaker
Tero Saarinen (born 1964), Finnish dance artist and choreographer, founder of Tero Saarinen Company
Tero Saviniemi (born 1963), Finnish javelin thrower
Tero Taipale (born 1972), Finnish footballer
Tero Tiitu (born 1982), Finnish floorball player

Finnish masculine given names